Marcello Bartalini (born 12 March 1962) is an Italian cyclist. He won the gold medal in Men's team time trial in the 1984 Summer Olympics

References

1962 births
Living people
Italian male cyclists
Olympic gold medalists for Italy
Cyclists at the 1984 Summer Olympics
Olympic cyclists of Italy
Olympic medalists in cycling
People from Empoli
Sportspeople from the Metropolitan City of Florence
Medalists at the 1984 Summer Olympics